The following highways are numbered 56:

International
 European route E56

Australia
 Oxley Highway

Canada
 Alberta Highway 56
 Saskatchewan Highway 56

China
  G56 Expressway

Czech Republic
 R56 Expressway

India
 National Highway 56 (India)

Iran
 Road 56

Italy
 Autostrada A56

Japan
 Japan National Route 56

Korea, South
 National Route 56
Gukjido 56

New Zealand
 New Zealand State Highway 56

Philippines
 N56 highway (Philippines)

United Kingdom
 British A56 (Chester-Broughton)
 British M56 (Cheadle-Mollington)

United States
 Interstate 56 (former proposal)
 U.S. Route 56
 Alabama State Route 56
 Arkansas Highway 56
 California State Route 56
 Colorado State Highway 56
 Florida State Road 56
 Georgia State Route 56
 Hawaii Route 56
 Illinois Route 56
 Indiana State Road 56
 Iowa Highway 56
 Kentucky Route 56
 Louisiana Highway 56
 Louisiana State Route 56 (former)
 Maryland Route 56
 Massachusetts Route 56
Michigan:
 M-56 (1919–1957 Michigan highway) (former)
 M-56 (1971–1987 Michigan highway) (former)
 Minnesota State Highway 56
 County Road 56 (Chisago County, Minnesota)
 County Road 56 (Dakota County, Minnesota)
 County Road 56 (St. Louis County, Minnesota)
Missouri Route 56 (1922) (former)
 Montana Highway 56
 Nebraska Highway 56
 Nebraska Link 56C
 Nebraska Link 56D
 Nebraska Link 56G
 Nebraska Recreation Road 56E
 Nebraska Recreation Road 56F
 Nevada State Route 56
 New Jersey Route 56
 County Route 56 (Bergen County, New Jersey)
 County Route 56 (Monmouth County, New Jersey)
 New York State Route 56
 County Route 56 (Dutchess County, New York)
 County Route 56 (Essex County, New York)
 County Route 56 (Jefferson County, New York)
 County Route 56 (Niagara County, New York)
 County Route 56 (Oneida County, New York)
 County Route 56 (Onondaga County, New York)
 County Route 56 (Oswego County, New York)
 County Route 56 (Putnam County, New York)
 County Route 56 (Rensselaer County, New York)
 County Route 56 (Saratoga County, New York)
 County Route 56 (Suffolk County, New York)
 North Carolina Highway 56
 North Dakota Highway 56
 Ohio State Route 56
 Oklahoma State Highway 56
 Oklahoma State Highway 56 Loop
 Pennsylvania Route 56
 South Carolina Highway 56
 Tennessee State Route 56
 Texas State Highway 56
 Texas State Highway Spur 56
 Farm to Market Road 56 (Texas)
 Texas Park Road 56
 Utah State Route 56
 Vermont Route 56 (former)
 Virginia State Route 56
West Virginia:
 West Virginia Route 56 (1920s) (former)
 West Virginia Route 56 (1930s) (former)
 Wisconsin Highway 56

See also
List of highways numbered 56A
A56